Lichen ruber moniliformis is a rare skin disease named for Fred Wise and Charles R. Rein.

It is one of several diseases also known as Kaposi's disease, based on its characterization in 1886 by Moritz Kaposi.

It is thought to be a rare variety of lichen planus.It is also known as "Morbus moniliformis lichenoides".

Presentation 
The disease causes numerous whitish punctiform papules and brownish macules arranged in a necklace-like pattern.

Diagnosis

Treatment

See also 
 Lichen planus
 List of cutaneous conditions

References

External links 

Lichenoid eruptions